The San Miguel Arcangel Church, also Marilao Church, is a 19th-century Roman Catholic Church located at Brgy. Poblacion I in Marilao, Bulacan. In 1997, a historical marker bearing the brief history of the church was installed by the National Historical Institute, precursor of the National Historical Commission of the Philippines.

History 
Prior to the construction of the present church of masonry, a previous chapel (locally called bisitang matanda) annexed to the parish of Meycauayan was established by Fr. Vicente de Talavera in 1796 on a nearby site, namely Tawiran. The present church was finished on April 21, 1868, under the supervision of the Franciscan Friars. The church became a casualty of the Philippine Revolution when it was gutted by fire in 1896. The church was transferred to the secular priests of the Archdiocese of Manila after the Philippine–American War and the expulsion of all regular friars. In 1961 it was transferred to the Diocese of Malolos. The church structure has undergone significant reconstruction in the years 1922 and 1967. On 8 May 2018, feast day of St Michael the archangel, The late Malolos Bishop Jose F. Oliveros celebrated one of his final masses in the parish 3 days before his death

Architecture 

The church façade is reminiscent of a typical Philippine Barn-Style Baroque church architecture, with its two levels and triangular pediment. The main portal, now with an attached concrete canopy, is flanked by niches of Saint Peter and Paul. The second level has three openings and is devoid of any intricate embellishment save for the pilasters rising to the bottom of the pediment, panels with embossed eye-shaped details and reliefs of heart sand the Franciscan seal. The four pilasters that rise from the first level to the base of the pediment are topped not by finial caps but by four statues that of the four evangelists. On the center of the pediment is an ornate niche with a statue of Saint Michael.  The pediment's edge is decorated by a raking cornice which tapers down to the two ends with scrolls. To the right of the façade is the two-storey octagonal bell tower which falls directly behind the façade and sits atop one of the two rectangular buttresses framing the façade. The belfry's first level is adorned with blind windows with balustrade on all sides. The top level has alternating blind and open windows and is capped with a cone.

Relic of the Apparition of Saint Michael 
Located at the foot of the image of Saint Michael on the main retablo is a relic of the Apparition of Saint Michael in Italy. Recalling the history of the said apparition, a herdsman named Gargan was pasturing his heard in the area when a bull wandered off into the mountains and went inside a cave. After locating the cave where the bull sought refuge, a man shot an arrow inside the cave but mysteriously bounced back and shot the one who released the arrow. With the puzzling event, the people sought the help of the local bishop. It is said the Saint Michael presented himself to the bishop and ordered the cave to be consecrated under his name. It is now known as the Sanctuary of Monte Sant'Angelo. Relics associated with the said apparition, such as that found inside this church, may have been rocks chipped off from the cave or pieces of cloth that has touched it.

References

External links 

 Website of the Provincial Government of Bulacan
 Saint Michael the Archangel Parish Church, Marilao, Bulacan Facebook Page 

Spanish Colonial architecture in the Philippines
Roman Catholic churches in Bulacan
Baroque architecture in the Philippines
Churches in the Roman Catholic Diocese of Malolos